The Vita Sancti Kentigerni ("Life of Saint Kentigern") is a hagiography of Saint Kentigern (also known as St. Mungo) written circa 1200 by Jocelyn of Furness.

References

External links 
 Jocelyn, a monk of Furness:  The Life of Kentigern, translation into English by Cynthia Whiddon Green
 A scanned manuscript of original Latin text of the Life of Kentigern at the British Library website

Christian hagiography